= Miss Sue from Alabama =

African American folk song

"Miss Sue From Alabama" is a song sung by African American children in the South at the turn of the 20th century. The children would then dance with each other.

The song was recorded in 1934 and 1939.
